Cormophytes (Cormophyta) are the "plants differentiated into roots, shoots and leaves, and well adapted for life on land, comprising pteridophytes and the Spermatophyta." 
This group of plants include mosses, ferns and seed plants. These plants differ from thallophytes, whose body is referred to as the thallus, i.e. a simple body not differentiated into leaf and stem, as of lichens, multicellular algae and some liverworts.

References

Plants
Biological classification
Historically recognized plant taxa